The Slovak Open is a professional tennis tournament played on indoor hardcourts. It is currently part of the Tretorn SERIE+ of the ATP Challenger Tour and ITF Women's Circuit. It is held at the Národné Tenisové Centrum in Bratislava, Slovakia, since 2000.

Past finals

Men's singles

Men's doubles

Women's singles

Women's doubles

External links
Official website
ITF Men's Search
ITF Women's Search

 
ATP Challenger Tour
ITF Women's World Tennis Tour
Tretorn SERIE+ tournaments
Hard court tennis tournaments
Indoor tennis tournaments
Tennis tournaments in Slovakia
Recurring sporting events established in 2000
Autumn events in Slovakia